Lin Xintong (born 4 July 2000) is a Chinese swimmer. She competed in the women's 50 metre butterfly event at the 2018 Asian Games, winning the bronze medal.

References

External links
 

 
 

2000 births
Living people
Chinese female freestyle swimmers
Chinese female butterfly swimmers
Place of birth missing (living people)
Asian Games medalists in swimming
Asian Games bronze medalists for China
Swimmers at the 2018 Asian Games
Medalists at the 2018 Asian Games
Swimmers at the 2018 Summer Youth Olympics
Youth Olympic gold medalists for China
21st-century Chinese women